Miss Universe 1979, the 28th Miss Universe pageant, was held on 20 July 1979 at the Perth Entertainment Centre in Perth, Australia. Margaret Gardiner of South Africa crowned her successor Maritza Sayalero of Venezuela. This marks as the first time a woman from Venezuela won the pageant.
It was the first time in the pageant's history that the event was held in Australia.

For the third time in the pageant's history (after 1961 and 1974), the first runner-up went on to be crowned Miss World later in the year.

Results

Placements

Preliminary Competition

Final Competition

Special Awards 

Order Of Announcements

Top 12

Top 5

Contestants

  – Elsie Maynard
  – Adriana Virginia Álvarez
  – Lugina Liliana Margareta Vilchez
  – Kerry Dunderdale
  – Karin Zorn
  – Lolita Louise Ambrister
  – Barbara Bradshaw
  – Christine Linda Bernadette Cailliau
  – Sarita Diana Acosta
  – Gina Ann Swainson
   – María Luisa Rendón
  – Alina Moeketse
  – Martha Jussara da Costa
  – Eartha Ferdinand
  – Heidi Quiring
  – María Cecilia Serrano Gildemeister
  – Ana Milena Parra Turbay
  – Carla Facio Franco
  – Lone Gladys Joergensen
  – Viena Elizabeth García Javier
  – Margarita Plaza
  – Judith Ivette López Lagos
  – Carolyn Ann Seaward
  – Tanya Whiteside
  – Päivi Uitto
  – Sylvie Hélène Marie Parera
  – Andrea Hontschik †
  – Katia Koukidou
  – Marie Cruz
  – Michelle Marie Domínguez Santos
  – Eunice Bharatsingh
  – Gina Maria Weidner Cleaves
  – Olivia Chang Man-Ai
  – Halldora Björk Jonsdóttir
  – Swaroop Sampat
  – Lorraine Marion O'Conner
  – Vered Polgar
  – Elvira Puglisi
  – Yurika Kuroda
  – Jae-hwa Seo
  – Irene Wong Sun Ching
  – Dian Borg Bartolo
  – Maria Lynda Allard
  – Blanca María Luisa Díaz Tejeda
  – Andrea Karke
  – Barbara Torres
  – Unni Margrethe Öglaend
  – Yahel Cecile Dolande
  – Molly Misbut
  – Patricia Lohman Bernie
  – Jacqueline Brahm
  – Criselda Flores Cecilio
  – Marta Maria Mendoça de Gouveia
  – Teresa López
  Réunion – Isabelle Jacquemart
  – Cheryl Chaderton
  – June de Nobriga
  – Lorraine Davidson
  – Elaine Tan Kim Lian
  – Veronica Wilson
  – Gloria María Valencia Rijo
  – Vidyahari Vanigasooriya
  – Sergine Lieuw-A-Len
  – Annette Marie Ekström
  – Birgit Krahl
  – Fabienne Tapare
   – Wongduan Kerdpoom
  – Lindiwe Bam
  – Marie Noelle Diaz
  – Fusin Tahire Dermitan
  – Elizabeth Busti
   – Mary Therese Friel
  – Linda Torres
  – Maritza Sayalero
  – Janet Beverly Hobson

Notes

Debuts

Returns
Last competed in 1974:
 
Last competed in 1977:

Withdrawals
  Bonaire
  Curaçao
 
 
 
 
  - Patricia Pineda Chamorro

Did not compete
  - Rosemary Forbes

References

1979
1979 in Australia
1979 beauty pageants
Beauty pageants in Australia
WAY 79
Events in Perth, Western Australia
July 1979 events in Australia
1970s in Perth, Western Australia